This article contains a list of Canadian Football League head coaches by regular season wins. This list is current through the close of the 2021 regular season.

This list also includes coaches who coached in the CFL's predecessor leagues, the Interprovincial Rugby Football Union (CFL East Division) and the Western Interprovincial Football Union (CFL West Division).

Wally Buono is the all-time leader in both wins and losses with 282 wins, 165 losses, and three ties. Ten coaches have more than 100 wins and only Buono and Don Matthews have more than 200.

As of the end of the 2022 CFL season, the active head coach with the most wins is Mike O'Shea, who has 82 wins and 58 losses.

Five head coaches share the record for Grey Cup championships at five: Wally Buono, Don Matthews, Frank Clair, Hugh Campbell, and Lew Hayman.

Top 20 head coaches by regular season wins

See also
List of professional gridiron football coaches with 200 wins

References

External links
CFL Guide & Record Book 2022

Records
Sports competition records